Maurice Lynell Harris (born November 11, 1992) is a former American football wide receiver. He played college football at California and signed with the Washington Redskins as an undrafted free agent in 2016. Harris was also a member of the New England Patriots, New Orleans Saints, and BC Lions.

Early years
Harris attended and played high school football at Northern Guilford High School.

College career
Harris attended and played college football at the University of California, Berkeley.

Professional career

Washington Redskins
After going unselected in the 2016 NFL Draft, Harris signed with the Washington Redskins on May 2, 2016.  On September 3, 2016, he was waived by the Redskins, but re-signed with their practice squad a day later. On October 21, 2016, he was activated from the practice squad to the active roster after wide receiver Josh Doctson was placed on the injured reserve list. Harris had his first career NFL reception in a game against the Minnesota Vikings in Week 10 of the 2016 season, finishing the game with three receptions for 28 yards.

On September 2, 2017, Harris was waived by the Redskins, and was signed to their practice squad the next day. He was promoted to the active roster on November 11, 2017. The following day, he caught a one-handed 36 yard pass against the Minnesota Vikings, the first touchdown of his career.

On November 4, 2018, Harris set a career high with 10 receptions on 12 targets for 124 yards in a loss against the Atlanta Falcons. He was placed on injured reserve on December 28, 2018. He finished the 2018 season with 28 receptions for 304 yards and no touchdowns.

New England Patriots
On March 14, 2019, Harris signed a one-year contract with the New England Patriots. He was released on August 25, 2019 with an injury designation. He reverted to injured reserve the next day, then was released with an injury settlement.

New Orleans Saints
On January 16, 2020, Harris signed a reserve/future contract with the New Orleans Saints. He was released on August 2, 2020.

BC Lions
Harris signed with the BC Lions of the CFL on February 16, 2021. He retired from football on June 23, 2021.

Personal life
Harris was married to Kayla Rodgers Harris. They have four children Brooklyn, Bailey, Kaisley and Berkeley. Kayla passed away on March 15, 2022. Harris' father-in-law is NFL positions coach Richard Rodgers while his brother-in-law is NFL tight end Richard Rodgers II. He is also the cousin and former high school and college teammate of Los Angeles Chargers wide receiver Keenan Allen.

References

External links
California Golden Bears bio

1992 births
Living people
African-American players of American football
Players of American football from Greensboro, North Carolina
American football wide receivers
California Golden Bears football players
Washington Redskins players
New England Patriots players
New Orleans Saints players
BC Lions players
21st-century African-American sportspeople